Celso Teixeira Brant (December 16, 1920 - April 24, 2004) was a Brazilian jurist, university professor of the Federal University of Minas Gerais (UFMG), writer and politician. He was the National Mobilization Party (PMN) candidate for President of Brazil in the 1989 General Election.

Biography 
For being Clóvis Salgado's cabinet chief, he became the acting Minister of Education between April and October 1956.

In the 1958 Legislative Elections he was elected Federal Deputy from Minas Gerais by the Republican Party (PR), adhering to the National Parliamentary Group.

Brant was nominated and ran for President of Brazil in the 1989 General Election by National Mobilization Party (PMN), receiving  109,909 votes or 0,16% of the valid votes. In the 1992 Municipal Elections he was elected Alderman of Belo Horizonte also by the PMN.

References 

1920 births
2004 deaths
People from Diamantina
Avante (political party) politicians
Party of National Mobilization politicians
Brazilian Labour Party (current) politicians
Republican Party (Brazil) politicians
Education Ministers of Brazil
Members of the Chamber of Deputies (Brazil) from Minas Gerais
Candidates for President of Brazil